Paing Soe (born 13 November 1951) is a Burmese dental professor who served as Rector of the University of Dental Medicine, Yangon from 1997 to 2003.  He is also the president of the Myanmar Dental Council (MDC) since January, 2012.

Early life and career
Paing Soe was born in Bago, Myanmar on 13 November 1951. He graduated from University of Sofia in July, 1971. He received Ph.D from University of Manchester in 1981.

See also
 Myanmar Dental Association
 University of Dental Medicine, Mandalay

References

Burmese dental professors
1951 births
Living people
Sofia University alumni